Matthew Holland (born 9 December 1971) is a former English cricketer.  Holland was a right-handed batsman who bowled slow left-arm orthodox.  He was born at Worcester, Worcestershire.

Holland made his Minor Counties Championship debut for Wiltshire in 1989 against Berkshire.  From 1989 to 1996, he represented the county in 23 Minor Counties Championship matches, the last of which came against Devon.  Holland also represented Wiltshire in the MCCA Knockout Trophy.  His debut in that competition came against Devon in 1989.  He next represented Wiltshire in this competition in 1995 and from 1995 to 1996, he represented the county in 4 further Trophy matches, the last of which came against Hertfordshire.

Holland also represented Wiltshire in 2 List A matches against Warwickshire in the 1989 NatWest Trophy and Surrey in the 1990 NatWest Trophy.

References

External links
Matthew Holland at Cricinfo
Matthew Holland at CricketArchive

1971 births
Living people
Sportspeople from Worcester, England
English cricketers
Wiltshire cricketers